Oreobolus obtusangulus is a thick cushion grass native to South America. It grows in the highlands of Colombia and Venezuela, alpine wetlands of Central Chile and Neuquén Province of Argentina. Further south it grows at lower elevations including Tierra del Fuego and Falkland Islands. Oreobolus obtusangulus grows in parts of Patagonia that were glaciated during the last glaciation, a genetic study suggest that the survived glaciation in three separate glacial refugia; these being south-central Chile, the eastern Patagonian Andes and eastern Tierra del Fuego.

References

obtusangulus
Flora of South America
Flora of the Falkland Islands
Cushion plants